In rhetoric, epizeuxis is the repetition of a word or phrase in immediate succession, typically within the same sentence, for vehemence or emphasis.  A closely related rhetorical device is diacope, which involves word repetition that is broken up by a single intervening word, or a small number of intervening words.

As a rhetorical device, epizeuxis is utilized to create an emotional appeal, thereby inspiring and motivating the audience. However, epizeuxis can also be used for comic effect.

Examples
 "Never give in — never, never, never, never, in nothing great or small, large or petty, never give in except to convictions of honour and good sense. Never yield to force; never yield to the apparently overwhelming might of the enemy."—Winston Churchill
 "Tomorrow, and tomorrow, and tomorrow, Creeps in this petty pace from day to day, To the last syllable of recorded time..."—Macbeth 
 "The horror, the horror"—Joseph Conrad, Heart of Darkness
 "Scotch, scotch, scotch, scotchy, scotchy scotch."—Ron Burgundy, Anchorman: The Legend of Ron Burgundy

See also 
 Anaphora
 Diacope
 Contrastive focus reduplication

References

External links 
 Text and Audio illustrations of epizeuxis

Rhetorical techniques